Illegal immigration to Russia has been ongoing. 

In 2012, the Russian Federal Security Service's Border Service stated there had been an increase in illegal migration from former Soviet states, such as Georgia, Ukraine and Moldova. Under legal changes made in 2012, illegal immigrants who are caught will be banned from reentering the country for ten years.

In 2021, according to Russian Deputy Interior Minister Alexander Gorovoy, there are more than 1 million illegal immigrants from CIS countries currently living in Russia.

According to Interior Ministry data, more than 332,000 illegal migrants from Uzbekistan currently reside in Russia, along with 247,000 from Tajikistan, 152,000 from Ukraine, 120,000 from Azerbaijan, 115,000 from Kyrgyzstan, 61,000 from Armenia, 56,000 from Moldova and 49,000 from Kazakhstan.

An organization opposed to illegal immigration called Movement Against Illegal Immigration was active in Russia from 2002 until 2011, when it was banned.

Due to Russia's declining population, and the low birth rates and high death rates of ethnic Russians, the Russian government has tried to increase immigration to the country in the last decade; which has led to millions of migrants flow into Russia from mainly post-Soviet states, many of whom are illegal and remain undocumented.

See also 
Demographics of Russia
Immigration to Russia
List of countries by foreign-born population
List of sovereign states and dependent territories by fertility rate

References 

Society of Russia
Russia
Crime in Russia by type
Demographics of Russia
Russia
Russia
Russia

ru:Иммиграция в Россию#Нелегальные иммигранты